There are hundreds of cultivars of the olive (Olea europaea). As one of the oldest and more important domesticated crops raised by humans, the olive tree has diverged naturally and with the assistance of man into many varieties. Olive cultivars are first and foremost divided into their location of origin; most names for cultivars come from place names. Secondarily, olives may be preferred for olive oil production or for eating as table olives, though many cultivars are dual-purpose.

Table of olives

See also
 Lists of cultivars

References

Further reading
 

 
Lists of cultivars